The Tattoo (Your Name) Tour was the fourth headlining concert tour by American country music singer Hunter Hayes, in support of his sophomore studio album, Storyline and began on August 30, 2014.

Opening acts
Dan + Shay
The Railers
 Abby Stewart

Setlist
"Storyline"
"Wild Card"
"Secret Love"
"Still Fallin'"
"Somebody's Heartbreak"
"Nothing Like Starting Over"
"Tattoo"
"Invisible"
"You Think You Know Somebody"
"Everybody's Got Somebody but Me"
"Flashlight"
"Light Me Up"
"Wanted"
"Love Makes Me"
"Counting Stars" 
"Your Song" 
"I Want Crazy"
Encore
"Storm Warning"
Source:

Tour dates

Notes
 The concert is a part of the Great Allentown Fair.
 This concert is a part of the Allegan County Fair.
 This concert is a part of the York Fair.
 This concert is a part of the 92.5 WXTU's After School Special.

Box office score data

References

Hunter Hayes concert tours
2014 concert tours